Good Times is the twentieth studio album by American singer and musician Elvis Presley, released on March 20, 1974. The album was constructed by the first pick of a session held at Stax Studios in Memphis in December 1973 and two songs, "I've Got a Thing About You Baby" and "Take Good Care of Her", which were left over from the session at Stax in July 1973. The album includes a collection of songs that vary in style and genre. Released the same day as the recording of Elvis: Recorded Live on Stage in Memphis was being made, the title was taken from the song "Talk About the Good Times". Many of the songs are covers of hits at the time, like "Spanish Eyes" and "She Wears My Ring". Charting low at the time of its release, it was considered typical 1970s Elvis material and was his first album to hit the "cut-out bins". The album did have some success though upon its original release, becoming a Cashbox Country Albums #1 hit and charting in the Top 50 in the UK. 

Original copies of the LP with the sticker on the cover (stating the singles on the album) are very rare and sell for large amounts on auction sites.

The album released two singles, both hits: "I've Got a Thing About You Baby" rose to #4 on the Country charts, #39 pop; "My Boy" hit #1 on the Adult Contemporary charts, as well as #14 Country and #20 Pop.

It has been claimed that "Talk About the Good Times" features an uncredited acoustic guitar performance by the song's author, Jerry Reed.

Track listing

Original release

Follow That Dream re-issue

Personnel

Elvis Presley – lead vocals
James Burton – lead guitar
Charlie Hodge – acoustic rhythm guitar
 Reggie Young – guitar
Johnny Christopher – guitar
 Dennis Linde – guitar on "Take Good Care of Her" and "I Got a Thing About You Baby"
Bobby Wood – piano except "My Boy"
 Per Erik "Pete" Hallin – piano on "My Boy"
Tommy Cogbill – bass guitar on "Take Good Care of Her" and "I’ve Got a Thing About You Baby"
Norbert Putnam – bass guitar
Bobby Emmons – Hammond organ except "My Boy"
 David Briggs – Hammond organ on "My Boy"
Ron Tutt – drums
 Jerry Carrigan – drums on "Take Good Care of Her" and "I’ve Got a Thing About You Baby"
 Joe Esposito – percussion on "Take Good Care of Her" and "I've Got a Thing About You Baby" (uncertain)
Mary and Ginger Holliday – backing vocals
Kathy Westmoreland – backing vocals

J. D. Sumner & The Stamps, Voice – backing vocals
Mike Leech – string and horn arrangements
Glen Spreen – string arrangement on "Take Good Care of Her" and "I've Got a Thing About You Baby"
Technical
Al Pachucki, Dick Baxter, Mickey Crofford, Mike Moran – engineers

References

External links

CPL1-0475 Good Times Guide part of The Elvis Presley Record Research Database
AFL1-0475 Good Times Guide part of The Elvis Presley Record Research Database
Yahoo! Music page

Elvis Presley albums
1974 albums
Albums produced by Felton Jarvis
RCA Records albums